Mercy Killers is an American goth band from Los Angeles, California, United States. It was formed in 2004 by future members of alternative rock band +44 Craig Fairbaugh and Shane Gallagher. Other members were Sam Soto aka Sampire on bass, Colin Barill on drums. They released their album Bloodlove June 6th 2006

Members 
 Craig Fairbaugh - lead guitar and vocals. Fairbaugh  was the guitarist for the Supergroup, +44, and former member of several other bands including Lars Frederiksen and the Bastards, Transplants, Juliette and the Licks, and The Forgotten.
 Sam Soto aka. Sampire - bass and vocals. Co-founder of the band Original Sinners and former member of Sluts for Hire.
 Colin Berrill - drums. Former member of Irish band The Gurriers.
 Shane Gallagher - guitar. also was part of +44, and of The Nervous Return.

Release
The debut release of the Mercy Killers self-titled EP on Rancid Records and a subsequent recording deal with Hellcat Records.

Discography 
 Mercy Killers (EP) (2005)
 Bloodlove (2006)

References 
 [ Mercy Killers on allmusic]
 Epitaph Records - Artist Info
 Hell cat records
 Mercy Killers on myspace

American gothic rock groups
Musical groups from Los Angeles
Hellcat Records artists